Rainbow Alley Provincial Park is a provincial park in British Columbia, Canada.

References

External links

Provincial parks of British Columbia
Regional District of Bulkley-Nechako
1999 establishments in British Columbia
Protected areas established in 1999